Lords of Sounds and Lesser Things is a 2005 EP released independently by the American alternative rock band Veruca Salt and self-distributed through their Velveteen Records label.

The EP features five new songs and a recording of Richard Patrick of Filter repeatedly yelling "I got my pants on!" Two of the songs (Save You and The Sun) were re-recorded for the band's fourth full-length record, IV. The EP was originally available only directly from the band on tour or via their website however it can now be found on most major online distributors.

Track listing 
"Save You" (Louise Post, Stephen Fitzpatrick) – 4:27
"Blood on My Hands" (Post, Fitzpatrick) – 3:30
"The Sun" (Post, Fitzpatrick) – 4:04
"I Got My Pants On" – 0:24
Samples: Richard Patrick of Filter
"Firefly" (Post) – 3:28
"For Days" (Post) – 4:08

Personnel 
 Louise Post – vocals, guitar
 Stephen Fitzpatrick – guitar
 Solomon Snyder – bass guitar
 Michael Miley – drums

References

External links 
Veruca Salt's official web site
Veruca Salt at Rolling Stone

Veruca Salt albums
2005 EPs